Lidia Morawska (born 10 November 1952, Tarnów, Poland) is a Polish-Australian physicist and distinguished professor at the School of Earth and Atmospheric Sciences, at the Queensland University of Technology and director of the International Laboratory for Air Quality and Health (ILAQH) at QUT. She is also co-director of the Australia-China Centre for Air Quality Science and Management, an adjunct professor at the Jinan University in China, and a Vice-Chancellor fellow at the Global Centre for Clean Air Research (GCARE), University of Surrey in the United Kingdom. Her work focuses on fundamental and applied research in the interdisciplinary field of air quality and its impact on human health, with a specific focus on atmospheric fine, ultrafine and nanoparticles. Since 2003, she expanded her interests to include also particles from human respiration activities and airborne infection transmission.

In 2018, she received the Eureka Prize for Infectious Diseases Research, as well as the American Association for Aerosol Research (AAAR) 2017 David Sinclair Award. In 2020, she contributed to the area of airborne infection transmission of viruses, including COVID-19. In that same year she became a Fellow of the Australian Academy of Science, and received the 2021 International Society of Indoor Air Quality and Climate Special 2020 Award for an Extraordinary Academic Leadership. In 2021, she was included on Time magazine's list of the 100 most influential people in the world.

Life and career
She was born in 1952 in Tarnów to father Henryk Jaskuła, a yachtsman and sailing captain, and mother Zofia. At the age of two, she moved with her family to Przemyśl where she grew up. She studied physics and received her doctorate in 1982 at the Jagiellonian University, Kraków, Poland for research on radon and its progeny.

From 1982 to 1987, she was a research fellow at the Institute of Physics and Nuclear Techniques, Academy of Mining and Metallurgy, Cracow, Poland.

Prior to joining the Queensland University of Technology (QUT) in 1991, she conducted research first at McMaster University in Hamilton as a postdoctoral research fellow of the International Atomic Energy Agency, and later at the University of Toronto between 1987 and 1991.

She has conducted research in this field since 1991, when she established the Environmental Aerosol Laboratory at QUT, renamed the International Laboratory for Air Quality and Health in 2002. She subsequently assumed a position as associate professor at the QUT in 2003.

She is a long-standing collaborator and advisor to the World Health Organization, contributing to all WHO air quality-related guidelines over the past two decades. She co-chairs the group responsible for the WHO Air Quality Guidelines, on which nations base their air quality standards.

In addition, she is Associate Editor of Science of the Total Environment journal, and in 2020.

Research
Her research interests and scientific contributions fall into eight main areas: (i) Instrumental techniques for ultrafine particle detection in the air; (ii) Combustion as a source of urban atmospheric pollution; (iii) The science of ambient particle dynamics; (iv) Indoor Air Quality; (v) Lung Deposition; (vi) Risk assessment and mitigation; (vii) Developing and utilising advanced networks for air quality sensing and analyses; and (viii) particles from respiratory activities and infection control.

She has received funding from different sources and for different research projects including:

COVID-19 research 
During the COVID-19 pandemic, she assembled and led a multidisciplinary group of 239 scientists guiding public health authorities worldwide to recognise the significance of airborne transmission of SARS-CoV-2 virus-laden particles and the risk it poses to human health. Based on this work, the WHO and other national authorities such as the US Center for Disease Control, subsequently updated their advice regarding airborne transmission. In 2020, she became a Member of the Task Force on Workplace, School, and Travel Safety, The Lancet COVID Commission, looking into building-related risk factors which are a critical, but missing, component of SARS-CoV-2 outbreak investigations.

Ultrafine particle research 
Her "Ultrafine Particles from Traffic Emissions and Children’s Health" project demonstrated that exposure to airborne ultrafine particles emitted in large quantities from vehicles was independently, positively associated with both systemic and respiratory inflammation and therefore has significant deleterious health impacts. In 2015, this evidence convinced the World Health Organization and individual countries to review national standards to protect children by controlling their exposure to ultrafine particles.  As a result, they changed their air quality guidelines to include recommendations regarding ultrafine particles.

Global Burden of Diseases studies 
Since 2012, she has also contributed work on international scientific programs, such as the Global Burden of Disease studies which quantitatively assess the impact of exposure to air pollution as a disease risk.

Honours and awards 
Her scientific career has been recognised and awarded in multiple occasions by various organisations, among those are:
2023: Matthew Flinders Medal and Lecture awarded by the Australian Academy of Science
2021: Time magazine's list of the 100 most influential people in the Innovators category
2021: ISIAQ Special 2020 Award for an Extraordinary Academic Leadership, International Society of Indoor Air Quality and Climate
2020: QUT Vice-Chancellors’ Award for Leadership Excellence, QUT Recognition Program
2020: Ranked 16,428 in the list of the 100,000 best scientists in the world according to the Stanford University
2020: Recognition by The Sydney Morning Herald as one of the best scientists in the area of health and science
2020: Nominee in the list of the Top 40 Australian scientists by the Australian Research Magazine
2020: Fellow of the Australian Academy of Science
 2018: Eureka Prize for Infectious Diseases Research by the Australian Museum of Eureka Prizes
 2017: David Sinclair Award by the American Association for Aerosol Research
 2017: Queensland University of Technology Vice-Chancellor's Performance Award
 2011: Clean Air Medal by the Clean Air Society of Australia and New Zealand

Selected works

She is credited with more than 950 academic publications, including scientific articles, book chapters, and conference papers. Among the most cited publications are:

 
 
 
 
 

Selected publications on Covid-19:

 Lidia Morawska, et al., "A paradigm shift to combat indoor respiratory infection". Science, 372(6543):  689-691, 2021.
 Lidia Morawska and Donald Milton, "It is Time to Address Airborne Transmission of COVID-19". Clinical Infectious Diseases, 71(9): 2311-2313, 2020.
 Lidia Morawska, et al., Morawska et al., "How can airborne transmission of COVID-19 indoors be minimised?" Environ. Int., 142:105832, 2020.

See also
List of Polish physicists

References

External links
 

Living people
1952 births
Fellows of the Australian Academy of Science
Jagiellonian University alumni
Academic staff of Queensland University of Technology
Academic staff of McMaster University
Academic staff of the University of Toronto
Polish scientists
Polish women physicists
Australian scientists
Australian women scientists
COVID-19 researchers